The 2015 FC Taraz season is the 7th successive season that the club will play in the Kazakhstan Premier League, the highest tier of association football in Kazakhstan, and 22nd in total. Taraz will play in the Kazakhstan Premier League as well as the Kazakhstan Cup.

Squad

Reserve team

Transfers

Winter

In:

Out:

Summer

In:

Out:

Competitions

Kazakhstan Premier League

First round

Results summary

Results by round

Results

League table

Relegation round

Results summary

Results by round

Results

League table

Kazakhstan Cup

Squad statistics

Appearances and goals

|-
|colspan="14"|Players away from Taraz on loan:
|-
|colspan="14"|Players who appeared for Taraz that left during the season:

|}

Goal scorers

Disciplinary record

References

FC Taraz seasons
Taraz